The Triangle 20 is a Canadian trailerable sailboat that was designed by American Charles Angle as a cruiser and first built in 1961.

Production
The design was built by Grampian Marine in Canada, from 1961 to 1963, with 75 boats completed, but it is now out of production. It was also sold in the US by the designer's company, Triangle Marine. It was sold complete or as a kit, for owner completion.

Design
The Triangle 20 is a recreational keelboat, built predominantly of fibreglass, with wood trim. It has a fractional sloop rig, a raked stem, a plumb transom, a keel-mounted rudder controlled by a tiller and a fixed stub long keel, with a retractable centreboard. It displaces  and carries  of ballast.

The boat is normally fitted with a small  outboard motor, mounted in a stern well, for docking and maneuvering.

The design has sleeping accommodation for two people, with a double "V"-berth in the bow. The galley is located on the starboard side, just forward of the companionway ladder. The galley is equipped with a two-burner stove and an ice box. The head is located opposite the galley on the port side and includes a sink that drains into the toilet.

See also
List of sailing boat types

References

Keelboats
1960s sailboat type designs
Sailing yachts 
Trailer sailers
Sailboat type designs by Charles Angle
Sailboat types built by Grampian Marine